A natural history museum (in title case) is a scientific institution with natural history collections.

Natural History Museum or Museum of Natural History may refer to these institutions:

American Museum of Natural History, New York City, New York, United States
Museum of Natural History, Belgrade, Serbia
Museum of Natural History, Görlitz, Germany
Museum of Natural History, Lima, Peru
Museum of Natural History, University of Wrocław, Poland
National Museum of Natural History, France, Paris, France
 Natural History Museum, Berlin, Germany
 Natural History Museum, London, England, United Kingdom
 Natural History Museum, Port Louis, Mauritius
 Natural History Museum, Vienna, Austria
 University of Michigan Museum of Natural History, Ann Arbor, Michigan, United States

See also 
 List of natural history museums
Museum of Natural History and Archaeology, Trondheim, Norway